The 12th Shorty Awards were held on May 3, 2020 via an online live stream event. The event was originally scheduled to be held at 1515 Broadway Theater in New York City, however, due to the COVID-19 pandemic, the event was held virtually. The digital show was hosted by American actor and comedian J. B. Smoove, and Fetty Wap provided a musical performance.  The show was streamed on Periscope and YouTube with presenters including Lindsey Vonn, Bobby Berk and Jaime Camil.

Influencer finalists and winners 
The full nominations were announced on January 21, 2020 before voting and academy rankings determined the finalists. The finalists were announced on March 10, 2020. Winners were announced at the ceremony on May 3, 2020.

Winners are listed first and in boldface.

Arts & Entertainment

Content of the Year

Creative & Media

Team Internet

Tech & Innovation

Phenom Award
The Phenom Award is given to those that used social media to make a significant impact benefiting the community.  The following received the 2020 Phenom Award:
 Jameela Jamil
 P. K. Subban
 Eugene Lee Yang

References

External links 
Nominees from the Official Shorty Awards website
Winners from the Official Shorty Awards website

Shorty Awards
2020 in Internet culture